Joshua Sinclair (born May 7, 1953) is an American writer, producer, actor and director born in New York City.

Filmography

References

1957 births
Living people
American male film actors
20th-century American male actors